The 1983–84 season was the 82nd in the history of the Western Football League.

The league champions for the first time in their history were Exmouth Town. The champions of Division One were Bristol City Reserves.

Final tables

Premier Division
The Premier Division remained at twenty clubs after Falmouth Town and Bridport left the league, and Keynsham Town and Portway Bristol were relegated to the First Division. Four clubs joined:

Bristol Manor Farm, champions of the First Division.
Mangotsfield United, runners-up in the First Division.
Minehead, from the Southern League – returning to the league after leaving in 1972.
Taunton Town, from the Southern League – returning to the league after leaving in 1977.

First Division
The First Division consisted of 21 clubs, increased from 19 the previous season, after Bristol Manor Farm and Mangotsfield United were promoted to the Premier Division. Four new clubs joined:

Backwell United, from the Somerset County League.
Keynsham Town, relegated from the Premier Division.
Portway Bristol, relegated from the Premier Division.
Warminster Town, from the Wiltshire League – returning to the league after leaving in 1939.

References

Western Football League seasons
6